49ers is the debut album by Italian Italo house dance act 49ers, released in 1990 on the Island record label. It features the hit singles "Touch Me" (UK No. 3, AUS No. 18), "Don't You Love Me" (UK No. 12, US No. 78, AUS No. 61) and "Girl to Girl" (UK No. 31).

Critical reception

In a retrospective review for AllMusic, Alex Henderson gave the album four out of five stars, describing most of the various singers on the album as having "big, substantial voices" and that the album's producer, Gianfranco Bortolotti, "sees to it that vocal personality is a prime ingredient of such exuberant offerings as "Girl to Girl," "Touch Me," and a remake of [Gloria] Gaynor's "I Will Survive"".

Track listing

Charts

References

External links
49ers at Discogs

1990 debut albums
4th & B'way Records albums
49ers (group) albums